The 2014 Michelin Ginetta GT4 Supercup was a multi-event, one make GT motor racing championship held across England and Scotland. The championship featured a mix of professional motor racing teams and privately funded drivers, competing in a Ginetta G55 or Ginetta G50 that conformed to the technical regulations for the championship. It formed part of the extensive program of support categories built up around the BTCC centrepiece. It was the fourth Ginetta GT4 Supercup, having rebranded from the Ginetta G50 Cup, which ran between 2008 and 2010. The season commenced on 30 March at Brands Hatch – on the circuit's Indy configuration – and concluded on 12 October at the same venue, utilising the Grand Prix circuit, after twenty-seven races held at ten meetings, all in support of the 2014 British Touring Car Championship season.

After a season in single-seaters, competing in the BRDC Formula 4 Championship in 2013, HHC Motorsport driver Charlie Robertson became champion, taking a season-high eight victories – including a weekend sweep at Oulton Park – during the campaign. He took a total of 20 podium finishes from the season's 27 races, and ultimately won the championship by 83 points after dropped scores were implemented. Dropped scores affected the season's runner-up; Douglas Motorsport's Andrew Watson finished second on gross points, but unlike his rivals David Pittard (SV Racing with KX) and Carl Breeze of United Autosports, he had to drop 23 points from his overall tally. Thus, Watson fell to fourth, as Pittard and Breeze finished second and third respectively. Pittard took five wins during the season, including a weekend sweep at Silverstone, Watson also won five races, while Breeze won four races at Croft and Knockhill. Century Motorsport's Tom Oliphant and Luke Davenport, team-mate to Breeze, each won two races, while Pepe Massot won at Donington Park for JHR Developments, before moving into the Porsche Carrera Cup Great Britain. In the teams' championship, United Autosports claimed the championship by over 150 points from HHC Motorsport.

Teams and drivers
For 2014, the G50 Cup car was no longer eligible for the championship and was replaced by the GT4 variant, allowing for increased entry numbers by opening it up to more foreign Ginetta owners. Furthermore, the newly homologated G55 model now conformed to GT4 specification. These changes led to the renaming of the championship to the 'GT4 Supercup'. Both cars ran in the same class through a balance of performance regulation introduced for 2014.

Race calendar and results
The series was held over 27 races at 10 rounds, supporting the 2014 British Touring Car Championship season at all rounds.

Championship standings

Drivers' championship
A driver's best 25 scores counted towards the championship, with any other points being discarded.

References

External links
 

Ginetta GT4 Supercup
Ginetta GT4 Supercup seasons